Stewart Alexander McKinney (born 20 November 1946) is a former Ireland international rugby union player. In 1974 he played for the British and Irish Lions on their tour of South Africa. At the time he played club rugby for Dungannon. He moved to England and played for London Irish. His son Sam was the club Captain for the London Irish Amateur club but now plays for Ballymena.Stuart also was an international shot putter taking on the likes of Geoff Capes and Mike Winch in the late 60s and early 70s. He still keeps fit and is a regular visitor to the Seven Towers Leisure Centre in Ballymena.

References

Living people
1946 births
Irish rugby union players
Ireland international rugby union players
British & Irish Lions rugby union players from Ireland
Ulster Rugby players
Dungannon RFC players
London Irish players